Events in the year 1959 in Spain.

Incumbents
Caudillo: Francisco Franco

Events
Stabilization Plan introduced to liberalize the Spanish economy, leading to the Spanish miracle of the 1960s.

Births
April 3 - Fermín Vélez, racing driver (died 2003).
April 26 
 Rosa Estiarte, Olympic swimmer (died 1985).
 Montserrat Majo, Olympic swimmer.
April 29 - Josep María Nogués, footballer.
June 9 - José Guirao, politician and cultural manager (died 2022).
July 3 - José Baselga, oncologist (died 2021).
September 24 - Ana Mato, politician.
October 1 - Marcos Alonso, footballer (died 2023).
October 4 - Patxi López, politician.
November 13 - José Carlos Somoza, writer.

Deaths

 July 7   – Hermenegildo Anglada Camarasa, Spanish painter (b. 1871)
 July 26 – Manuel Altolaguirre, Spanish poet (b. 1905)
  August 8 – Luis Araquistáin, Spanish politician and writer (b. 1886)
 October 27 – Juan José Domenchina, Spanish poet (b. 1898)

See also
 List of Spanish films of 1959

References

 
Years of the 20th century in Spain
1950s in Spain
Spain
Spain